Trey Benson (born July 23, 2002) is an American football running back for the Florida State Seminoles. He previously played for the Oregon Ducks.

High school career
Benson attended O'Bannon High School in Greenville, Mississippi before transferring to St. Joseph Catholic High School in Greenville, Mississippi. In his final two seasons combined, he had 3,616 yards and 48 touchdowns. He committed to the University of Oregon to play college football.

College career
Benson played at Oregon in 2020 and 2021. After missing 2020 due to a torn ACL, he had six carries for 22 yards and a touchdown in 2021. After the season, he transferred to Florida State University. In his first year at Florida State, he initially split time with Lawrance Toafili and Treshaun Ward before eventually becoming the lead back.

References

External links
Florida State Seminoles bio

Living people
Players of American football from Mississippi
American football running backs
Oregon Ducks football players
Florida State Seminoles football players
2002 births